Hertha Nunatak is a nunatak  northwest of Castor Nunatak in the Seal Nunataks group, off the east coast of the Antarctic Peninsula. It was first seen and mapped as an island in December 1893 by Captain Carl Anton Larsen, who named it after the Hertha, a ship which combined sealing and exploring activities along the west coast of the Antarctic Peninsula under Captain Carl Julius Evensen in 1893–94. It was determined to be a nunatak by the Swedish Antarctic Expedition under Otto Nordenskiöld during a sledge journey in 1902.

References

Nunataks of Graham Land
Oscar II Coast